Guapi Airport , also known as 
Juan Casiano Airport (is an airport serving Guapi, a municipality in the Cauca Department of Colombia.

The Guapi non-directional beacon (Ident: GPI) is located on the field.

Airlines and destinations

See also
Transport in Colombia
List of airports in Colombia

References

External links 
OpenStreetMap - Guapi
OurAirports - Guapi
FallingRain - Guapi Airport

Airports in Colombia
Buildings and structures in Cauca Department